George Philip may refer to:
George Philip (cartographer) (1800–1882), cartographer and map publisher
George Philip (goalkeeper), Scottish football goalkeeper for Hearts and Dundee 
George Philip (footballer), Scottish footballer for Dundee and Sunderland in 1911–1921
George Philip Jr. (1912–1945), US Navy Commander killed in action in World War II, namesake of USS George Philip (FFG-12)

See also
George Phillips (disambiguation)
George Philips (disambiguation)